The New River is a stream, about  long, on the southern coast of the U.S. state of Oregon.  It begins slightly north of Floras Lake, at the confluence of the lake outlet and Floras Creek, and runs north behind a foredune until entering the Pacific Ocean between Bandon and Port Orford.

The river's name stems from its creation in 1890, when sand blocked the outlet from Floras Lake during a heavy storm, and the resulting flood created a new channel behind the foredune. The water from  Floras Creek also flows down the new channel. The river loses only  in elevation between source and mouth.

Pre-history
Evidence suggests that as early as 8,000 years ago, long before the New River existed, ancestors of the Siletz and Coquille peoples lived here in large villages near an estuary. On January 26, 1700, a  tsunami destroyed the estuary and altered the landscape. After the catastrophe, blowing sand blocked streams, creating wetlands behind the dunes.

Wildlife
The area near the river, between Bandon to the north and Cape Blanco to the south, includes many state, federal, and county parks, recreation areas, and wildlife sanctuaries. Among those are the New River Area of Critical Environmental Concern (ACEC), overseen by the Bureau of Land Management. The BLM encourages public uses of the  site at the same time it works to protect habitat for native plants, birds, animals, and fish.

The dunes kept the river in its new channel but displaced native vegetation such as sand verbena and otherwise altered the habitats used by birds and other life forms.

The New River is the southernmost area of record for rufous hummingbirds and the most northern for Allen's hummingbirds to have been observed breeding. Snowy plovers are present year-round. Posted areas within the ACEC are closed to the public from March 15 to September 15 to protect nesting plovers.  The spring migration brings approximately 20,000 Aleutian cackling geese (Branta hutchinsii leucopareia) and close to 100,000 shorebirds.

Recreation
The New River ACEC comprises four units—Storm Ranch, Floras Lake, Fourmile
Creek, and Lost Lake—connected by hiking trails to parking, restrooms, a Nature Center, and other structures. River Road, with a gravel surface suitable for bicycling and horseback-riding, as well as walking, leads from the parking area to a boat ramp on the New River.

The Lower Fourmile takeout involves at  portage to a parking lot along Lower Fourmile Road. The Storm Ranch route may also require a portage since the River Road gate is closed to vehicles from March 15 to September 15.

The New River supports populations of Chinook salmon and other migratory fish. The river is closed to fishing for coho salmon, but anglers can fish for Chinook, steelhead, and searun cutthroat trout from the river banks or from boats without motors. Surfperch frequent the river mouth.

See also 
 List of rivers of Oregon

References

External links

 BLM's New River ACEC – BLM video on YouTube
 New River ACEC – Photo album by the Bureau of Land Management (BLM) on Flickr
 New River ACEC – Oregon Coast Aquarium's Oceanscape Network

Rivers of Oregon
Rivers of Curry County, Oregon
Rivers of Coos County, Oregon